The Crescent Development Project or The Crescent Bay (formerly known as Caspian Plus) is skyscraper complex which is under construction on the Caspian Sea coast in Baku,  Azerbaijan.

The complex comprises an offshore hotel (Crescent Hotel), office tower (Crescent City), residential tower, and a retail and entertainment centre (Crescent Place). The project is intended to be an architectural landmark.

History
In February 2008, skyscrapernews.com, a well-known architectural review website, published an article about two projects designed by the Korean company, Heerim Architects, for construction in Baku. The projects, both with a lunar theme, were described as, "an attempt to reinvent the concept of the skyscraper beyond the traditional". 
The article described two skyscraper complexes, proposed for construction on neighbouring peninsulas, on opposite shores of Baku Bay. The first, Full Moon Bay, was to be constructed on the western side of the bay. It included a 158-meter, 35-storey, discoid hotel called "Palace of the Winds 1 and 2". 
The second complex, "Caspian Plus", had been proposed for construction on the eastern edge of Baku Bay near the seaport, acting as a counterpoint to "Full Moon Bay". Initially, the second project included a 32-storey crescent-shaped hotel (standing on its "horns" offshore), four high-rise residential buildings, and a 43-story business centre standing 203 metres tall (now called Crescent City Tower).
The fate of the related projects remained uncertain until October 2009 when foundation work in the location of the "Caspian Plus" complex was started.

The project has since been modified. A trio of high-rise residential buildings was removed to avoid visual overlapping of two other buildings (Port Baku Towers and Port Baku Residence). After modification, the project consisted of a hotel ("The Crescent Hotel"), an office tower ("The Crescent City"), and a high-rise residential building with a podium ("The Crescent Place"). The previous name of the project, "Caspian Plus", was changed to "The Crescent Development Project".

The project Full Moon Bay was cancelled.

Project
The "Crescent Development Project" is situated with one part on the waterfront of Baku. An offshore part, which includes "The Crescent Hotel", will be located on an artificial island about 170 metres from shore. There will be an office tower ("The Crescent City"), and a residential high-rise building with a podium ("The Crescent Place"), on the coastline behind "The Crescent Hotel".

The Crescent Hotel
"The Crescent Hotel" is a curving arched building. It is designed to look like a crescent moon with its points on the surface of the Caspian Sea. The crescent shape of the building refers to one of the symbols of Azerbaijan, depicted on its national flag. The skyscraper’s arcuate configuration will not affect the interior of the hotel as the building will rely on two multi-storey column-like towers, which will create additional space and act as a support for the hotel. These supporting towers are called Eastern and Western in accordance with their location. "The Crescent Hotel" comprises 32 floors (28 storeys of the hotel itself standing over a 4-storeys podium). Upon completion, the hotel will comprise 230 guest rooms, 74 apartments and 16 villas. The total area is 177 969 m², parking is planned for 601 cars. "The Crescent Hotel" will be connected to the shore and other buildings of the project via a bridge. This hotel is planned to be a 'seven-star' facility.

The Crescent City
The office tower “The Crescent City”, is a 210-metre skyscraper with 43 overground levels. It is being built behind "The Crescent Hotel" on the waterfront next to the seaport of Baku and the “JW Marriott Absheron”. According to the project design, the facade of the building is cylindrical and slightly flattened at the north-south direction. The bottom of the tower is narrow and widens as it approaches the top which includes a concave notch. The shape of "The Crescent City" is designed to resemble a torch.

The Crescent Place
"The Crescent Place" consists of 3 basement floors and 32 overground levels: a 5-storey podium, 2 floors of town houses and a 25-storey residential tower with 2 additional penthouse levels. The Crescent Place will be located onshore next to the tower of "The Crescent City". This residential building, standing 170 metres tall, will include 168 apartments. The total area of the Crescent Place is 273 000 m² with space for approximately 100 retail outlets and an additional 40 food and beverage units.

Construction
According to a report published by the management company, almost all piling work for the project had been completed by November 2013. Nine per-cent of the entire project had been constructed. Ten per-cent of the coastal part of the Project had been completed.

In July 2015, DSA Architects International was appointed to take over multidisciplinary lead consultancy design services on the Crescent Development Project, with construction works ongoing.

Site of The Crescent Hotel
The plot for "The Crescent Hotel" lies within an area in the Caspian Sea. In May 2012, hehe setting was started. These piles were installed in two rows around the perimeter of the future hotel's location. A double metal fence was then installed around the site which restricted any additional water entering the area. Once the fence was completed, water was pumped from the site and it was filled with sand to create the foundation of the building. As of early 2013, the soil creating the artificial island has been formed, and foundation work for the Western and Eastern towers is completed.  The piles constructed for "The Crescent Hotel", with a diameter 1500–2000 mm and a length 76.1 meters, are the biggest ever built in Azerbaijan. It was planned to build 464 piles by the end of 2013.
By the beginning of 2015, development of both the Eastern and Western Towers had begun on the artificial island.

Given the complexity of the building’s geometry, a number of contracting companies from the world-wide were engaged in the construction. Many of them faced challenges in achieving their goals. So, Derby Design Engineering cited that the main challenge was to design a constructible solution for the link-bridge between the column-like towers. This arch has a span of 90 meters which supports 5 hotel levels, hanging off the link-bridge truss. The Koltay Facades website stated that curved sides of the hotel represent an exciting challenge for engineers and designers; floor by floor, the slope of the glass is changing, and so are the components of the reaction forces on the slab, the appearance of the glass, the safety requirements, amongst the others.

Sites of The Crescent City and Crescent Place
Construction of the onshore foundation started in October 2009. For all parts of the coastline (sites of "The Crescent City" and "The Crescent Place"), 691 short piles with a diameter of 1.2 m and a depth of 26 meters have been installed
.
For the tower “The Crescent city” 118 deep piles (diameter 1500 mm, depth of 52-61,5 meters) were constructed.

By November 2013, 4 taps had been installed on the site of "The Crescent Place". First floors of the podium were appearing above the fence. The construction of the residential tower, "The Crescent Place", had been started. By the beginning of 2015, 35th floor of The Crescent Place Tower was being constructed.

By March 2014, the foundation of "Crescent City Tower" had been ready for concrete core pouring. As of beginning 2015, The Crescent City Tower was being constructed at 16-17 levels. In August 2015, the concrete core of the building reached up to the 30th level. By December 2015, the 43rd level of the concrete core of the Crescent City was completed.

Completion 
According to a spokesman of Ilk Construction, completion of the shell and core of "The Crescent Place" is scheduled for January 2015; the site of "The Crescent City" must be finished by May of the same year. Completion of the entire project was planned for the second half of 2017 but as of February 2019, technical difficulties have prevented the completion of the arch section that will ultimately join the two towers. The completion date is currently estimated as late 2020.(Update) The date of completion is unknown.

Gallery

References

External links
 Heerim Architects & Planners
 GilanHolding.com
 www.dsa-arch.com
ThorntonTomasetti.com
 Lotos.com
 ilkconstruction.com
 AZ Architecture & Engineering Developments (AZ A&E)
  Alt URL
 Archiloverz.org
 Inside Pictures of Crescent Moon Tower Dubai
 

Buildings and structures under construction in Azerbaijan
Skyscrapers in Azerbaijan
Buildings and structures in Baku
Skyscraper hotels
Skyscraper office buildings
Residential skyscrapers
Retail buildings in Azerbaijan